Qaraqalpaqstan or Karakalpakstan (Karakalpak: Қарақалпақстан, Qaraqalpaqstan) is an urban-type settlement of Qońirat district in the autonomous Republic of Karakalpakstan in Uzbekistan. Its population was 3,013 people in 1989, and 4,500 in 2016.

References 

Populated places in Karakalpakstan
Urban-type settlements in Uzbekistan